Lindbladia may refer to:

1448 Lindbladia – a main-belt asteroid
Linbladia – monotypic genus of Lindbladia tubulina